The Dark Path is an original novel written by David A. McIntee and based on the long-running British science fiction television series Doctor Who. The novel features the Second Doctor, Jamie, Victoria and the Master (who is using the name 'Koschei' here), looking at the events that led to the Master's descent and subsequent transformation into villainy.

Plot
"He's one of my own people, Victoria, and he's hunting me."

The Darkheart is a faded neutron star surrounded by dead worlds. Except one: the last enclave of the Earth Empire, and as the rest of the galaxy enjoys the fruits of the fledgling Federation, these isolated Imperials hide a horrifying secret.

The TARDIS crew arrive to find that the Federation has come to reintegrate this lost colony. But all is not well in the Federation camp: allegiances shift, the fierce Veltrochni have vengeful plans of their own, and another time traveller is manipulating the mission for his own mysterious reasons - a true master of his craft, and a face the Doctor has not forgotten.

The Doctor must uncover the terrible secret which brought the Empire to this desolate sector, and find the source of the strange power maintaining their society. But can a Time Lord, facing the ultimate temptation, control his own desires?

Trivia
This novel takes place after the Missing Adventure Twilight of the Gods by Christopher Bulis.

In Slavic mythology and Russian mythology, Koschei is an evil immortal sorcerer, menacing principally young women. Koschei is also known as Koschei the Immortal or Koschei the Deathless due to his soul being sealed inside a needle inside an egg on a hidden island, enabling him to live forever as long as the needle is intact. Given the Master's obsession for further regenerations in The Keeper of Traken and The Five Doctors, the name is apt.

References

External links
The Cloister Library - The Dark Path

1997 British novels
1997 science fiction novels
Virgin Missing Adventures
Second Doctor novels
Novels by David A. McIntee
The Master (Doctor Who) novels
Novels set on fictional planets
Fiction set in the 4th millennium